Northern Satakunta  is a subdivision of Satakunta and one of the Sub-regions of Finland since 2009.

Municipalities
 Honkajoki
 Jämijärvi
 Kankaanpää
 Karvia
 Siikainen

Politics
Results of the 2018 Finnish presidential election:

 Sauli Niinistö   60.3%
 Laura Huhtasaari   12.5%
 Paavo Väyrynen   9.2%
 Matti Vanhanen   7.4%
 Pekka Haavisto   4.2%
 Merja Kyllönen   3.1%
 Tuula Haatainen   3.1%
 Nils Torvalds   0.2%

Sub-regions of Finland
Geography of Satakunta